Narcis (M923) is a  of the Belgian Naval Component, launched in 1990, at the Mercantile-Belyard shipyard in Rupelmonde and christened by Mrs. Lafosse-De Backer, the wife of the then Mayor of Mons, on 14 March 1991. The patronage of Narcis was accepted by the city of Mons. It was the ninth of the Belgian Tripartite-class minehunters. The Belgian government chose to deploy the ship as part of its involvement with enforcing the Libyan no-fly zone.

References

External links

Tripartite-class minehunters of the Belgian Navy
Ships built in Belgium
Ships built in France
Ships built in the Netherlands
1990 ships
Minehunters of Belgium